Sinicaepermenia sauropophaga is a moth in the family Epermeniidae. It was described by Reinhard Gaedike, Hiroshi Kuroko and Katsuyuki Funahashi in 2008. It is found in Thailand.

The length of the forewings is 4-4.5 mm for males and 4.8–5 mm for females. The forewings are dark reddish brown mixed with black scales. The hindwings are pale grey.

The larvae feed on Sauropus androgynus. Young larvae feed in a tunnel made under the epidermis of a young stem or sprout of the host plant. Pupation takes place in a silken cocoon made in the space between leaves.

Etymology
The species is named after Sauropus, the genus of the host plant.

References

Moths described in 2008
Epermeniidae
Moths of Asia